Tchernyshevioides is a diminutive trilobite that lived during the early Middle Cambrian (Amgaian) and has been found in the Russian Federation (Pseudanomocarina-zone, Sulyukta region, Tian-Shan) and the Jbel Wawrmast Formation of Morocco.

Etymology 
Tchernyshevioides has been named in honor of the Russian paleontologist N.E. Tchernysheva.

Description 
The central raised area (or glabella) of the headshield (or cephalon) is long and reaches the anterior border furrow. The occipital ring is well defined and carries a long posterodorsal spine. Otherwise the glabella has no transvers furrows. The border furrow is distinct and the border wide. The free cheeks (or librigenae) are very short. The cephalic angle carries a slender spine of almost equal length as the glabella, directed backwards and outwards at about 45°. The thorax is unknown. Pygidium with axis of six rings plus terminus. There are five well defined pleural furrows and the border is narrow and smooth.

References 

Eodiscina
Cambrian trilobites
Fossils of Morocco
Fossils of Russia
Animals described in 1975